San Mateo is an unincorporated community in Putnam County, Florida, United States, located just southeast of the city of Palatka.  It is on the east shore of the St. Johns River between buoys 12 and 15; stretching from Buzzard Island to the entrance to Dunn's Creek. The main road through San Mateo is US Route 17, with a southern terminus of the overlap with Florida State Roads 20 and 100.

Geography

References

Unincorporated communities in Putnam County, Florida
Unincorporated communities in Florida
Former municipalities in Florida
Populated places on the St. Johns River